Raluca Sandu (born 3 February 1980) is a Romanian retired tennis player and professional padel player.

On 18 January 1999, she reached her highest WTA singles ranking of 68 whilst her best doubles ranking was 228 on 13 September 1999.

Raluca turned pro at the age of 15 and reached WTA top 100 by the time she was 17 years old. She was also ranked top 10 in the world ITF juniors ranking, reaching the semifinals at the 1995 US Open. 
Raluca was forced to retire early due to shoulder injury (2004).

Personal
Raluca is the daughter of former Romanian football player and former president of the Romanian Football Federation, Mircea Sandu and her late mother, Simona Arghir former handball player and captain of Romanian national handball team. Raluca has one more sibling, older brother Dan Mircea. In her youth she was dating former world number 1 Carlos Moya for two years.

ITF Circuit finals

Singles (4–7)

Doubles (1–2)

Head-to-head records
Players who have been ranked world No. 1 are in boldface.

 Magdalena Maleeva 1-0
 Anna Kournikova 1-1
 Elena Dementieva 1-0
 Amélie Mauresmo 1–0
 Svetlana Kuznetsova 1-0
 Patty Schnyder 0–1
 Serena Williams 0–1
 Conchita Martínez Granados 1-0
 Jelena Kostanić 0–1
 Elena Vesnina 1–0

References

External links
 
 
 

1980 births
Living people
Tennis players from Bucharest
Female tennis players playing padel
Romanian female tennis players